The Ijuí River (Portuguese, Rio Ijuí) is a river of Rio Grande do Sul state in southern Brazil. It is a tributary of the Uruguay River.

The name Ijuí (the earlier spelling Ijuhy is to be found in older documents and maps), like many geographical names and names of topographical features in Brazil, originated from the Guarani language.

See also
List of rivers of Rio Grande do Sul
Cerro do Inhacurutum

References

Brazilian Ministry of Transport

Rivers of Rio Grande do Sul